A number of different spacecraft have been used to carry cargo to and from space stations.

Table code key

Orbital space vehicles

Notes

See also 
Comparison of crewed space vehicles
Comparison of orbital launch systems
Comparison of orbital rocket engines

References

Technological comparisons